La Chascona is a house in the Barrio Bellavista of Santiago, Chile, which was owned by Chilean poet Pablo Neruda. La Chascona reflects Neruda's quirky style, in particular his love of the sea, and is now a popular destination for tourists. Neruda began work on the house in 1953 for his then secret lover, Matilde Urrutia, whose curly red hair inspired the house’s name; chascona is a Chilean Spanish word of Quechua origin referring to a wild mane of hair. In the house, there is a 1955 painting "Matilde" by Diego Rivera.  It was given to Urrutia by Neruda. It depicted a two-faced Urrutia, one face depicting the Urrutia as the singer the public knew, and the other depicting the lover Neruda knew. The painting also has a hidden image; the profile view of Neruda's face hidden in her hair, showing their continuous secret relationship. Urrutia would become the poet’s third wife and she took on the task of restoring the house following the poet’s death in 1973, when La Chascona suffered damage during the military coup.

La Chascona is managed today by the Pablo Neruda Foundation.

See also
 Casa de Isla Negra
 La Sebastiana

References

External links 
 

Buildings and structures in Santiago
Museums in Santiago, Chile
Biographical museums in Chile
Houses of Pablo Neruda
Literary museums in Chile